Atwater is a city in Kandiyohi County, Minnesota, United States. The population was 1,124 at the 2020 census.

Geography

U.S. Route 12 serves as a main route in the city.

History
Atwater was laid out in 1869, and incorporated in 1876. The city was named for E. D. Atwater, a railroad official. A post office has been in operation at Atwater since 1870.

Education
Atwater is part of a consolidated school district with the cities of Cosmos and Grove City, which comprise the "ACGC" school district. Their mascot name is the Falcons. School colors are teal, black and silver. Currently, students in grades 5-12 attend classes in the neighboring town of Grove City. Younger students from Atwater attend ACGC North Elementary located approximately one-quarter mile from the downtown.

Government
The town has a three-person police department.

Demographics

2010 census
As of the census of 2010, there were 1,133 people, 468 households, and 312 families living in the city. The racial makeup of the city was 97.2% White, 0.1% African American, 0.1% Native American, 0.3% Asian, 2.0% from other races, and 0.4% from two or more races. Hispanic or Latino of any race were 4.0% of the population.

There were 468 households, of which 32.9% had children under the age of 18 living with them, 51.7% were married couples living together, 10.3% had a female householder with no husband present, 4.7% had a male householder with no wife present, and 33.3% were non-families. 29.1% of all households were made up of individuals, and 13.7% had someone living alone who was 65 years of age or older. The average household size was 2.37 and the average family size was 2.91.

The median age in the city was 37.7 years. 25.1% of residents were under the age of 18; 8.2% were between the ages of 18 and 24; 23.4% were from 25 to 44; 28.8% were from 45 to 64; and 14.7% were 65 years of age or older. The gender makeup of the city was 49.2% male and 50.8% female.

2000 census
As of the census of 2000, there were 1,079 people, 461 households, and 296 families living in the city. The racial makeup of the city was 97.96% White, 0.09% African American, 0.09% Native American, 0.19% Asian, 0.09% Pacific Islander, 0.74% from other races, and 0.83% from two or more races. Hispanic or Latino of any race were 1.30% of the population.

There were 461 households, out of which 27.5% had children under the age of 18 living with them, 53.4% were married couples living together, 8.2% had a female householder with no husband present, and 35.6% were non-families. 32.3% of all households were made up of individuals, and 20.0% had someone living alone who was 65 years of age or older.  The average household size was 2.31 and the average family size was 2.89.

In the city, the population was spread out, with 23.3% under the age of 18, 9.2% from 18 to 24, 25.1% from 25 to 44, 24.1% from 45 to 64, and 18.4% who were 65 years of age or older.  The median age was 41 years. For every 100 females, there were 91.0 males.  For every 100 females age 18 and over, there were 89.0 males.

The median income for a household in the city was $39,265, and the median income for a family was $48,289. Males had a median income of $30,365 versus $22,625 for females. The per capita income for the city was $21,112.  About 4.1% of families and 5.5% of the population were below the poverty line, including 7.1% of those under age 18 and 4.0% of those age 65 or over.

References

External links
Atwater Chamber of Commerce
Atwater-Cosmos-Grove City School District
 

Cities in Minnesota
Cities in Kandiyohi County, Minnesota